Miss Suwanna of Siam, was a 1923 romance film written and directed by Henry MacRae, set in Thailand (then Siam) and starring Thai actors. It was one of the first feature films to be made in Thailand, and was the first Hollywood co-production in Thailand.

Nothing of the film exists today except for some promotional materials and other ephemera held at the Thailand National Film Archive.

Plot
The film is a romance about a young woman named Suwanna who is the object of affection for many men. In her search for true love, she has many adventures and mishaps, including overcoming her father's disapproval, before finally finding her soulmate.

Cast
 Sa-ngiam Navisthira (Later Anindhita Akhubutra) as Suwanna
 Khun Ram Pharotsat (Yom Mongkhonnat) as Klahan
 Luang Pharotkamkoson (Mongkhon Sumonnat) as Kongkaew

Crew
Director – Henry MacRae
Assistant director – Robert Kerr (He returned to Siam in 1928 to direct his own film, The White Rose. It was shown in Bangkok in September 1928.)
Cinematographer – Dal Clawson

Premiere
Suwanna of Siam was an 8-reel silent film. It premiered on June 22, 1923 at the Nakhon Si Thammarat Theatre, and then opened the next day at the Phatthanakon Cinematograph, the Hong Kong Cinema Hall and the Victoria Theater.

A newspaper account of the opening reads:

Production
Production started in 1922, but before he could begin filming, MacRae had to first ask permission of the Siamese Royal Court.

"Today Mr Henry A. MacRae came to see me. I assured him of two things: first, traveling; second, finding a place for film processing and screening. Above these, he has to take care of himself. For our benefit, he has to give a copy of the film to the State Railway in return...", an excerpt from the writings of Prince Kampaengpet reads, in reaction to a visit by MacRae, who wanted to "take picture[s] of Bangkok and the Beauties of Siam, including the King and the Palace Buildings."

"I felt that His Majesty, King Rama VI, would be interested in moving pictures," McRae wrote in The Film Year Book (1924). "And after considerable maneuvering I finally secured an audience which resulted in securing the entire [Royal Entertainment] Company's assistance together with the free use of the King's 52 automobiles, His Majesty's 600 race horses, the free use of the navy, the Royal Palaces, the railways, the rice mills, thousands of miles of rice fields, coconut groves, klongs and Elephants, and white elephants at that."

Ultimately, according to Thai film scholar Chalida Uabumrungjit, the Siamese government "allowed the making of this film in order to show the world the positive image of Siam at the time. Therefore, many incidents in the film featured the modern elements in Thai society such as travelling by express train or mail plane."

Controversy and disappearance
When MacRae finished the film, he did give a copy to the Royal State Railway, per his agreement with Prince Kumbaengbejr. The railway agency had a public relations division that oversaw film production as a means to promote tourism in the kingdom (which is much the same way the modern-day Tourism Authority of Thailand operates in its promotional activities regarding film productions and the Bangkok International Film Festival). MacRae also turned over a copy to King Vajiravudh. It was shown in Bangkok for three days, but soon after it was lost.

Film historians have searched, but the negatives of the film have not been found anywhere, nor is there evidence the film was even shown in the United States upon MacRae's return.

One reason it may have been lost is due to a controversial scene in the film, in which MacRae filmed an execution of a prisoner, which led to criticism in the local media.

"I would like to blame the local officer who did not save the honor of the country by forbidding them to do so. The execution will represent the barbarism of Siam," a columnist said in the newspaper, Sambhand Thai.

The movie was subject to censorship, and it is believed that the execution scenes were cut.

Legacy
While research and discussion about Miss Suwanna has long been the province of film historians and scholars, the subject of the film received mainstream attention as a major plot point in the 2006 Thai comedy, Nong Teng Nakleng-pukaotong (literally, Nong and Teng, the Golden Mount Gangsters). The story involves a likay performer (portrayed by Pongsak Pongsuwan) in 1923 Siam who finds his family's troupe being evicted from his theater to make way for a new phenomenon being brought to Siam by foreigners – film. Together with his friend (Choosak Eamsuk), Nong seeks to disrupt the production of Miss Suwanna, which he sees as a corruptive influence on traditional culture.

Alternate titles
Despite the Royal Thai General System of Transcription for transliteration of Thai into English, the title of Miss Suwanna of Siam is stated many different ways. The title character's name has been alternately stated as Suwann, Suwan, Suwarn, Suvarn, Suwarna or Suvarna. The Thai title is Nang Sao Suwan, Nong Sao Suwan or Nangsao Suwan, with alternate English titles, The Gold of Siam or Kingdom of Heaven.

See also
Cinema of Thailand
List of lost films

References

External links

Miss Suwanna of Siam at SilentEra

1923 films
Thai black-and-white films
Lost American films
American silent feature films
Films directed by Henry MacRae
American black-and-white films
American romance films
1920s romance films
1923 lost films
Lost romance films
1920s American films